Sophia Bennett (born 1966) is a British children's writer, author of several novels for young adults. Her debut novel Threads, won the Times/Chicken House competition in 2009, and in 2017 Love Song won the Goldsboro Books Romantic Novel of the Year. Her books have been published around the world.

Biography 
Bennett was born in Yorkshire and educated at London University. She has a PhD in Modern Italian Literature from Cambridge University.  She is an occasional visiting lecturer in writing for children and young adults at City Lit and City University in London and a Fellow of the Royal Literary Fund.

Bibliography

Novels 
 Threads (2009) (Winner, Times/Chicken House Prize 2009)
 Beads (2010)
 Stars (2011)
 The Look (2012)
 You Don't Know Me (2013) (Shortlisted for the Book Trust Best Book of the Year 2014)
 The Castle (2014) (Shortlisted for the Oxfordshire Book Award 2015)
 Love Song (2016) (Winner, RNA Goldsboro Books Romantic Novel of the Year 2017)
 Following Ophelia (2017)
 The Windsor knot (2020)

References

External links 
 Official website
 Chicken House books - Sophia Bennett
 Sophia Bennett Love Song Interview

1966 births
British women children's writers
Living people
British writers of young adult literature